Kaj Ab (also Romanized as Kaj Āb) is a village in Bakharz Rural District, in the Central District of Bakharz County, Razavi Khorasan Province, Iran. At the 2006 census, its population was 33, in 7 families.

References 

Populated places in Bakharz County